Genetic studies on Serbs show close affinity to other neighboring South Slavs.

Y-DNA
Y-chromosomal haplogroups identified among the Serbs from Serbia and near countries are the following with respective percentages: I2a (36.6-42%), E1b1b (16.5-18.2%), R1a (14.9-15%), R1b (5-6%), I1 (1.5-7.6%), J2b (4.5-4.9%), J2a (4-4.5%), J1 (1-4.5%), G2a (1.5-5.8%), and several other uncommon haplogroups with lesser frequencies.

I2a-P37.2 is the most prevailing haplogroup, accounting for one-third of Serbians. It is represented by four sub-clusters I-PH908 (25.08%), I2a1b3-L621 (7.59%), I2-CTS10228 (3.63%) and I2-M223 (0.33%). A 2019 study of Serb samples from different parts of the Western Balkans showed that "approximately half of them originated from Herzegovina and Old Herzegovina" which population throughout history strongly influenced today's Serbian male genetics. Older research considered that the high frequency of this subclade in the South Slavic-speaking populations to be the result of a "pre-Slavic" paleolithic settlement in the region, the research by O.M. Utevska (2017) confirmed that the haplogroup STR haplotypes have the highest diversity in Ukraine, with ancestral STR marker result "DYS448=20" comprising "Dnieper-Carpathian" cluster, while younger derived result "DYS448=19" comprising the "Balkan cluster" which is predominant among the South Slavs. This "Balkan cluster" also has the highest variance in Ukraine, which indicates that the very high frequency in the Western Balkan is because of a founder effect. Utevska calculated that the STR cluster divergence and its secondary expansion from the middle reaches of the Dnieper river or from Eastern Carpathians towards the Balkan peninsula happened approximately 2,860 ± 730 years ago, relating it to the times before Slavs, but much after the decline of the Cucuteni–Trypillia culture. More specifically, the "Balkan cluster" is represented by a single SNP, I-PH908, known as I2a1a2b1a1a1c in ISOGG phylogenetic tree (2019), and according to YFull YTree it formed and had TMRCA approximately 1,850-1,700 YBP (2nd-3rd century AD). Although I-L621 it is dominant among the modern Slavic peoples on the territory of the former Balkan provinces of the Roman Empire, until now it was not found among the samples from the Roman period and is almost absent in contemporary population of Italy. It was found in the skeletal remains with artifacts, indicating leaders, of Hungarian conquerors of the Carpathian Basin from the 9th century, part of Western Eurasian-Slavic component of the Hungarians. According to Pamjav et al. (2019) and Fóthi et al. (2020), the distribution of ancestral subclades like of I-CTS10228 among contemporary carriers indicates a rapid expansion from Southeastern Poland, is mainly related to the Slavs and their medieval migration, and the "largest demographic explosion occurred in the Balkans".

E1b1b-M215 is the second most prevailing haplogroup amongst Serbs, accounting for nearly one-fifth of Serbians. It is represented by four sub-clusters E-V13 (17.49%), E1b1b-V22 (0.33%), and E1b1b-M123 (0.33%). In Southeast Europe, its frequency peaks at the southeastern edge of the region and its variance peaks in the region's southwest. Although its frequency is very high in Kosovar Albanians (46%) and Macedonian Romani (30%), this phenomenon is of a focal rather than a clinal nature, most likely being a consequence of genetic drift. E-V13 is also high amongst Albanians in North Macedonia (34%) and Albanians in Albania (24%), as well as ethnic Macedonians, Romanians, and Greeks. It is found at low to moderate frequencies in most Slavic populations. However, amongst South Slavs, it is quite common. It is found in 27% of Montenegrins, 22% of Macedonians, and 18% of Bulgarians, all Slavic peoples. Moderate frequencies of E-V13 are also found in Italy and western Anatolia. In most of Central Europe (Hungary, Austria, Switzerland, Ukraine, Slovakia), it is found at low to moderate frequencies of 7-10%, in both R1a (Slavic) and R1b (Germanic/Celtic) dominated populations. It likely originated in the Balkans, Greece, or the Carpathian Basin 9000 YBP or shortly before its arrival in Europe during the Neolithic. Its ancestral haplogroup, E1b1b1a-M78, is of northeast African origin.

R1a1-M17 accounts for about one-seventh to one-sixth of Serbian Y-chromosomes. It is represented by four sub-clusters R1a (10.89%), R1a-M458 (2.31%), R1a-YP4278 (1.32%), and R1a-Y2613 (0.33%). Its frequency peaks in Ukraine (54.0%). It is the most predominant haplogroup in the general Slavic paternal gene pool. The variance of R1a1 in the Balkans might have been enhanced by infiltrations of Indo-European speaking peoples between 2000 and 1000 BC, and by the Slavic migrations to the region in the early Middle Ages. A descendant lineage of R1a1-M17, R1a1a7-M458, has the highest frequency in Central and Southern Poland.

R1b1b2-M269 is moderately represented among Serbian males (6–10%), 10% in Serbia (Balaresque et al. 2010), with subclade M269* (xL23) 4.4% in Serbia, 5.1% in Macedonia, 7.9% in Kosovo. The highest frequency in the central Balkans (Myres et al. 2010). It has its frequency peak in Western Europe (90% in Wales), but a high frequency is also found in Central Europe among the West Slavs (Poles, Czechs, Slovaks) and Hungarians as well as in the Caucasus among the Ossetians (43%). It was introduced to Europe by farmers migrating from western Anatolia, probably about 7500 YBP. Serb bearers of this haplogroup are in the same cluster as Central and East European ones, as indicated by the frequency distributions of its sub-haplogroups with respect to total R-M269. The other two clusters comprise, respectively, West Europeans and a group of populations from Greece, Turkey, the Caucasus and the Circum-Uralic region.

J2b-M102 and J2a1b1-M92 have low frequencies among the Serbs (6–9% combined). Various other lineages of haplogroup J2-M172 are found throughout the Balkans, all with low frequencies. Haplogroup J and all its descendants originated in the Middle East. It is proposed that the Balkan Mesolithic foragers, bearers of I-P37.2 and E-V13, adopted farming from the initial J2 agriculturalists who colonized the region about 7000 to 8000 YBP, transmitting the Neolithic cultural package.

I1-M253 is also found in low frequencies (1.5-7.6%) and is represented by three sub-clusters I1-P109 (5.28%), I1 (1.32%), and I1-Z63 (0.99%).

An analysis of molecular variance based on Y-chromosomal STRs showed that Slavs can be divided into two  groups: one encompassing West Slavs, East Slavs, Slovenes, and western Croats, and the other – all remaining Southern Slavs. Croats from northern Croatia (Zagreb region) fell into the second group. This distinction could be explained by a genetic contribution of pre-Slavic Balkan populations to the genetic heritage of some South Slavs belonging to the group. Principal component analysis of Y-chromosomal haplogroup frequencies among the three ethnic groups in Bosnia and Herzegovina (Bosnian Serbs, Bosnian Croats, and Bosniaks), showed that Bosnian Serbs and Bosniaks are genetically closer to each other than either of them is to Bosnian Croats (mainly due to Bosnian Croats very high I2a frequency). According to correspondence analysis, admixture analysis and Rst genetic distance, Serbian regional population samples cluster together and are closest to Montenegrins, Macedonians and Bulgarians, with Western Serbians being an intermediate between them and Croatian-Bosnian and Herzegovinian cluster. According to 2022 study on 1200 samples from Serbia, Old Herzegovina, Kosovo and Metohija, "genetic distances between three groups of samples, evaluated by the Fst and Rst statistical values, and further visualized through multidimensional scaling plot, showed great genetic similarity between datasets from Old Herzegovina and present-day Serbia. Genetic difference in the haplogroup distribution and frequency between datasets from historical region of Old Herzegovina and from geographical region of Kosovo and Metohija was confirmed with highest Fst and Rst vaules".

Y-DNA Haplogroup frequencies

mtDNA
According to Davidovic et al. (2014) study of Mitochondrial DNA in 139 samples in Serbia are present "mtDNA lineages predominantly found within the Slavic gene pool (U4a2a*, U4a2a1, U4a2c, U4a2g, HV10), supporting a common Slavic origin, but also lineages that may have originated within the southern Europe (H5*, H5e1, H5a1v) and the Balkan Peninsula in particular (H6a2b and L2a1k)". According to 2017 study on haplogroup U diversity "putative Balkan-specific lineages (e.g. U1a1c2, U4c1b1, U5b3j, K1a4l and K1a13a1) and lineages shared among Serbians (South Slavs) and West and East Slavs were detected (e.g. U2e1b1, U2e2a1d, U4a2a, U4a2c, U4a2g1, U4d2b and U5b1a1). The exceptional diversity of maternal lineages found in Serbians may be associated with the genetic impact of both autochthonous pre-Slavic Balkan populations whose mtDNA gene pool was affected by migrations of various populations over time (e.g. Bronze Age pastoralists) and Slavic and Germanic newcomers in the early Middle Ages". The 2020 study of 226 samples mitochondrial genome data of Serbian population "supported more pronounced genetic differentiation among Serbians and two Slavic populations (Russians and Poles) as well as expansion of the Serbian population after the Last Glacial Maximum and during the Migration period (fourth to ninth century A.D.)".

Autosomal DNA

According to 2013 autosomal IBD survey "of recent genealogical ancestry over the past 3,000 years at a continental scale", the speakers of Serbo-Croatian language share a very high number of common ancestors dated to the migration period approximately 1,500 years ago with Poland and Romania-Bulgaria cluster among others in Eastern Europe. It is concluded to be caused by the Hunnic and Slavic expansion, which was a "relatively small population that expanded over a large geographic area", particularly "the expansion of the Slavic populations into regions of low population density beginning in the sixth century" and that it is "highly coincident with the modern distribution of Slavic languages". The 2015 IBD analysis found that the South Slavs have lower proximity to Greeks than with East Slavs and West Slavs, and "even patterns of IBD sharing among East-West Slavs–'inter-Slavic' populations (Hungarians, Romanians and Gagauz)–and South Slavs, i.e. across an area of assumed historic movements of people including Slavs". The slight peak of shared IBD segments between South and East-West Slavs suggests a shared "Slavonic-time ancestry". The 2014 IBD analysis comparison of Western Balkan and Middle Eastern populations found negligible gene flow between 16th and 19th century during the Islamization of the Balkans.

According to a 2014 autosomal analysis of Western Balkan, the Serbian population shows genetic uniformity with other South Slavic populations, but the "Serbians and Montenegrins have an intermediate position on PCA plot and on Fst–based network among other Western Balkan populations". In the 2015 analysis, Serbians were again in the middle of a Western South Slavic cluster (Croatians, Bosnians and Slovenians) and Eastern South Slavic cluster (Macedonians and Bulgarians). The western cluster has an inclination toward Hungarians, Czechs, and Slovaks, while the eastern cluster toward Romanians and some extent Greeks. The studies also found very high correlation between genetic, geographic and linguistic distances of Balto-Slavic populations. According to a 2020 autosomal marker analysis, Serbians are closest to Bosnians while the ethnically close Montenegrins are in-between them and Kosovo Albanians.

A genetic study of Sorbs showed that they share greatest affinity with Poles, while the results of comparison to the Serbs and Montenegrins because of historical hypotheses of common origin showed that "the Sorbs were most different to Serbia and Montenegro, likely reflecting the considerable geographical distance between the two populations."

Physical anthropology
According to Serbian physical anthropologist Živko Mikić, the medieval population of Serbia developed a phenotype that represented a mixture of Slavic and indigenous Balkan Dinaric traits. Mikić argues that the Dinaric traits, such as brachycephaly and a bigger average height, have been since then becoming predominant over the Slavic traits among Serbs.

Gallery

See also 
Origin hypotheses of the Serbs
Genetic studies on Croats
Genetic studies on Bosniaks
Genetic studies on Bulgarians
Y-DNA haplogroups by ethnic group
Y-DNA haplogroups in populations of Europe

References

Sources

Further reading

External links 
Serbian DNA Project
Poreklo - Society of genetic genealogy

Serbs
Serbian studies
Serbian genealogy
Serbs